Joann Kagan Downey (born October 31, 1966) is an American Democratic Party politician who represented the 11th Legislative District in the New Jersey General Assembly from 2016 to 2022.

Early life
Downey was born in Jersey City, New Jersey. She holds a Bachelor of Arts from Rutgers University in 1988, where she studied Political Science and English, a Juris Doctor from New York Law School in June 1991 and a Masters of Social Work from Boston University School of Social Work in 2005. After graduating from Freehold Township High School, Downey was accepted to the New Jersey State Police, inspired by her father, who was a New Jersey State Trooper. Downey ultimately decided to pursue law school and prosecutorial work instead. She went on to serve as Deputy State Attorney General, working in the Department of Children and Families. Downey cites this experience as the impetus that moved her to work toward her Masters in Social Work.

New Jersey Assembly
Downey was elected to the General Assembly alongside running mate Eric Houghtaling in November 2015. Their narrow victory was considered by many to be an unexpected upset. In July 2018 Downey and fellow Assemblyman Eric Houghtaling accused fellow Assemblywoman Serena DiMaso of violating the Truth-In-Caller ID while sending out robocalls.

In 2021, Downey and Houghtaling narrowly lost their reelection bids  in an upset to Republican candidates Marilyn Piperno and Kim Eulner.

Committees 
Human Services
Financial Institutions and Insurance

Electoral history

Assembly

References 

1966 births
Living people
Freehold Township High School alumni
Democratic Party members of the New Jersey General Assembly
People from Freehold Township, New Jersey
Politicians from Jersey City, New Jersey
Politicians from Monmouth County, New Jersey
Rutgers University alumni
New York Law School alumni
Boston University School of Social Work alumni
21st-century American politicians